The Greatest Store in the World is a book written by Alex Shearer, later made into a made-for-television film which was broadcast on 24 December 1999 by CBBC (on BBC One). The TV movie has been shown a few times at Christmas on the CBBC channel. It was filmed in the famous London department store Harrods (though the name "Harrods" is not used in the story).

Plot
The story is told in flashback by Livvy (played by Elizabeth Earl), a bright young girl who is in police custody on Christmas Day. As she is questioned, she reveals that for several days, she and her equally resourceful mother Geraldine (Dervla Kirwan) and younger sister Angeline (Holly Earl) have been living in a department store called "Scottley's" since their camper van blew up. As the story progresses, the family deal with outsmarting staff, in particular Mr Whiskers (Peter Capaldi) the friendly but suspicious doorman, icy deputy manager Miss Greystone (Helen Schlesinger), and Santa (Ricky Tomlinson) and his elf (Sean Hughes). There is also a guest appearance from S Club 7 in an advertising stunt by department store owner Mr Scottley (Brian Blessed). On Christmas morning, Ms Greystone, Santa and his elf attempt to burgle the store safe.

Cast

The Williams Family
 Dervla Kirwan as Geraldine
 Elizabeth Earl as Livvy
 Holly Earl as Angeline

Managers and Staff of Scottley's
 Peter Capaldi as Mr Whiskers
 Helen Schlesinger as Miss Greystone
 Ricky Tomlinson as Santa
 Sean Hughes as Elf
 Brian Blessed as Mr Scottley

Staff and Pupils of Livvy's School
 Philip Wright as Mr Norris
 Devon Anderson as David

Guest Stars
 Tina Barrett as Herself
 Paul Cattermole as Himself
 Jon Lee as Himself
 Bradley McIntosh as Himself
 Jo O'Meara as Herself
 Hannah Spearritt as Herself
 Rachel Stevens as Herself

See also 
 List of Christmas films

External links

 

1999 British novels
1999 films
1999 television films
British Christmas films
British drama films
British novels adapted into films
Christmas television films
Films set in department stores
S Club 7 television series
1990s English-language films
1990s British films